Kozhinskaya is a rural locality (a village) in Slobodskoye Rural Settlement, Kharovsky District, Vologda Oblast, Russia. The population was 15 as of 2002.

Geography 
Kozhinskaya is located 34 km northeast of Kharovsk (the district's administrative centre) by road. Arzubikha is the nearest rural locality.

References 

Rural localities in Kharovsky District